Victor Covalenco (born 26 October 1975) is a Moldovan decathlete and a two-time Olympian for his native country.

Achievements

External links 
 IAAF profile for Victor Covalenko
 sports-reference.com

1975 births
Living people
Moldovan decathletes
Athletes (track and field) at the 2004 Summer Olympics
Athletes (track and field) at the 2008 Summer Olympics
Olympic athletes of Moldova